Agha Saleem (born Agha Khalid Saleem; 7 April 1935 – 12 April 2016) was a Pakistani writer, novelist, playwright and poet. He work was primarily focused on fiction writing, novels, dramas, regional films and travel literature. He is also credited for translating Sindhi language books into Urdu and English language, including Shah Abdul Latif Bhittai's book titled Risalo.

He was born as Agha Khalid Saleem in Shikarpur, Sindh to a Pakhtun family. He did his primary schooling from a school in his hometown. In 1948, he went to Hyderabad and graduated from a public college called Government College Kali Mori (now Government College University Hyderabad) in 1958. He had two sons, including Agha Jamshed Khan and Agha Khudadad Khan and a daughter Agha Gul Zareen Khan.

Literary career 
Agha started his career around 1957 to 1958. His first short story titled Ahh Ae Zalim Samaj (O, you cruel society) was published in 1958 when he graduated from the college. As a playwright, he started writing radio plays with Radio Pakistan after completing his education. His first novel titled Ondhahi Dharti Roshan Hath'a (Dark Land, Bright Hands) was published in 1972. The novel he wrote depicted Indus Valley civilisation of Mohenjo-daro which primarily revolves around historical events of the civilisation till the dominion of Pakistan created two new sovereign states India and Pakistan followed by the split of Indian subcontinent. His prominent novels included Oondahi Dharti, Hamma Oast and Roshan Hath. He was inspired by the political movement against One Unit, a geopolitical programme launched by the government of Pakistan and was actively involved in contentious politics-writings and pro-democracy movement in an attempt for mass mobilisation.

His first radio play titled Wapsi and Dodo Chanesar are recognized among the prominent ones. Later, he wrote more plays, including Roop Bahroop, Gul Chhino Girnar Jo, and Gulan Jahera Ghava. His poetic series titled Pann Chhan Aeen Chand was published in 1986.

As an editor, he also worked for two local newspapers of that time such as Jaago and Daily Sach.

Work

Arrests 
In 1978 he was arrested and later prosecuted under martial law for disrespecting the country's founder. The case was later dismissed after Qazi Muhammad Akbar, a Pakistani politician helped him get out of prison.

Awards

Death 
Agha was suffering from heart complications and was under medical treatment at a hospital. He died of a heart stroke on 12 April 2016 in Karachi, Pakistan.

Footnotes

References

1935 births
2016 deaths
Pakistani novelists
Sindhi people
Recipients of the Pride of Performance
Pakistani male short story writers
Sindhi-language writers
20th-century novelists
People from Shikarpur District
Pakistani male journalists
Pakistani translators
Pakistani broadcasters
20th-century Pakistani short story writers
20th-century male writers
Recipients of Latif Award
20th-century translators